Ioke  is the Hawaiian language equivalent for the name Joyce (name). It may also refer to:
 Hurricane Ioke (2006)
 Ioke (programming language)
 Ioke (mythology), personification of pursuit in Greek mythology